Eemeli Reponen (born 6 June 1990) is a Finnish professional football coach and a former player. He works as a goalkeepers coach with Honka. Reponen started his junior career in FC Jazz and has also played for the junior squad of TPS.

References

External links
Guardian Football
FC Inter Turku

1990 births
Living people
Finnish footballers
Finland under-21 international footballers
Association football goalkeepers
FC Inter Turku players
Kotkan Työväen Palloilijat players
Åbo IFK players
Turun Palloseura footballers
Veikkausliiga players
Kakkonen players
People from Nakkila
Sportspeople from Satakunta